Sari Bolagh may refer to:

Sari Bolagh, Ardabil
Sari Bolagh, East Azerbaijan
Sari Bolagh, Hamadan